WBGU-TV, virtual channel 27 (UHF digital channel 22), is a Public Broadcasting Service (PBS) member television station licensed to Bowling Green, Ohio, United States. Owned by Bowling Green State University, it is sister to radio station WBGU (88.1 FM). The two stations share studios at the Tucker Center for Telecommunications on the BGSU campus; WBGU-TV's transmitter is located near Belmore, Ohio. (While officially part of the BGSU campus, the Tucker Center is actually located two blocks south of Wooster Street, which marks much of the southern boundary of the campus.) Unlike the radio station, WBGU-TV is not primarily operated by students at the university; however, the station does offer many different student positions that allow students to gain experience. WBGU is one of two PBS member stations in the Toledo television market, alongside WGTE-TV (channel 30) in Toledo proper. WBGU also serves as the primary PBS member station for the Lima market, as that market does not have a PBS member station of its own.

History
WBGU-TV began broadcasting February 10, 1964, from a transmitter site on the campus. It operated on channel 70 and broadcast exclusively in black and white, as was then the norm, within a  radius of the BGSU campus.

To increase the coverage area of WBGU-TV, the Ohio Educational Television Network Commission applied for and received a construction permit in 1971 to build a satellite in Lima on channel 57. In the process, however, what was planned as a separate station, WQOL, turned into a major transmitter upgrade for WBGU-TV. A new, 759,000-watt color transmitter and tower near Leipsic were activated when WBGU-TV—the last full-power station to broadcast on a channel 70 or above in the United States—moved to channel 57. WBGU-TV would move to channel 27 in 1986, expanding its coverage area and beginning to broadcast in stereo. Channel 27 had originally been proposed for the Lima satellite plan, but protests from the nearby WGTE-TV in Toledo, which operated on the adjacent channel 30 at the time and, because of significant territorial overlap, feared confusion between the two channels, prompted state and university officials to settle for the higher channel number.

The station first broadcast from a small studio located in the university's South Hall. After the Moore Musical Arts Center was built in 1979, the university's radio stations and telecommunications department (then the department of radio, television, and film) moved to West Hall, which formerly housed the university's college of music. Sometime after that, WBGU-TV moved to a new building located at 245 Troup Avenue in Bowling Green; the building was renamed the Tucker Center on May 6, 1994.

During the 1970s and early 1980s, WBGU maintained a low-powered repeater in Fort Wayne, Indiana on channel 39, W39AA (later to affiliate with Indianapolis' WFYI), which became full-powered WFWA in 1985.

Today, WBGU-TV broadcasts to nineteen counties in northwestern and west central Ohio including the markets of Toledo and Lima. With most attic antennas, WBGU's signal can be tuned in as far west as Fort Wayne and as far north as central Lenawee County, Michigan.

In Toledo, Buckeye Broadband carries WBGU-TV on cable channel 57, which is, ironically, the station's previous channel number on the UHF dial. No subchannels are available on Buckeye Broadband.

WBGU turned off its analog transmitter at midnight on December 14, 2008, and relocated its digital signal from channel 56 to channel 27.

In 2019, WBGU-TV won an regional Emmy Award for a training video produced in conjunction with campus police to help counter active shooter threats.

Digital channels
The station's digital signal is multiplexed:

Spectrum reallocation
WBGU-TV had considering selling off its UHF frequency as part of the digital spectrum auction, for mobile bandwidth use, but pulled out late in the auction bidding process. The station remained on the air, but relocated to UHF 22 from UHF 27 on December 4, 2018.

Programming

National programming produced by WBGU includes The American Woodshop, distributed by the National Educational Telecommunications Association.

Each weekday during the academic term of public schools in the Great Black Swamp region, WBGU-TV broadcasts six hours of educational programming provided (and, in some cases, produced) by the Northwest Ohio Educational Technology Foundation. The NWOET is operated at the Tucker Center, but is a non-profit state agency separate from the university.

References

External links

WBGU-TV website
Northwest Ohio Educational Technology Foundation
The Tucker Center for Telecommunications

BGU-TV
PBS member stations
Bowling Green State University
Television channels and stations established in 1964
1964 establishments in Ohio